Nikolai Vasilyevich Vorobyov (born 21 May 1960 in Leningrad now St. Petersburg) is a Russian professional football coach and a former player.

He worked as an assistant coach with FC Zenit St. Petersburg.

Honours
 Soviet Top League champion: 1984.
 USSR Federation Cup finalist: 1986.

European club competitions
With FC Zenit St. Petersburg.

 UEFA Cup 1987–88: 2 games.
 UEFA Cup 1989–90: 4 games.

External links
 Career summary at KLISF

1960 births
Living people
Soviet footballers
Soviet Top League players
FC Zenit Saint Petersburg players
Russian football managers
FC Tyumen managers
FC Zenit Saint Petersburg non-playing staff
Association football defenders
FC Dynamo Saint Petersburg players